The 2013–14 NCAA Division III men's ice hockey season began on October 26, 2013, and concluded on March 22, 2014. This was the 41st season of Division III college ice hockey.

The WIAC began sponsoring ice hockey for the 2013–14 season. Because the conference contained only five active ice hockey programs (below the minimum of seven required by the NCAA) the league did not receive an automatic bid to the NCAA tournament for its conference tournament champion. The NCHA, with only two teams remaining, then merged with the MCHA. The new league would retain the NCHA name and preserve its automatic qualifier.

Regular season

Season tournaments

Standings

Note: Mini-game are not included in final standings

2014 NCAA Tournament

Note: * denotes overtime period(s)

See also
 2013–14 NCAA Division I men's ice hockey season
 2013–14 NCAA Division II men's ice hockey season

References

External links

 
NCAA